Henry Robinson (c. 1553 – 19 June 1616) was an English cleric who served as Bishop of Carlisle from 1598 to 1616. He was educated at The Queen's College, Oxford (B.A. 12 July 1572, M.A. 20 June 1575, B.D. 10 July 1582, and D.D. 6 July 1590). He was elected fellow of Queen's in 1575, was Principal of St Edmund Hall, Oxford from 1576 to 1581, and then Provost of Queen's from 1581 to 1598. He was also a member of Gray's Inn from 1601 and took part in the Hampton Court Conference of 1603.

Memorial Inscription

Memorial to Bishop Henry Robinson in Carlisle Cathedral. The inscription reads:

Henrico Robinsono Carleolensi SS. Theol. Doctori, collegii reginae Oxoniae praeposito providissimo, tandemq. hujus Ecclesiae per annos xviii Episcopo vigilantissimo. xiiio Calend. Julii, anno apartu virginis, 1616, aetat. suae lxiiiio pie in Domino obdormienti. Bernard' Robinsonus frater ac haeres hoc qualecunq. μνημειον, amoris testimonium collocavit.

Non sibi, sed Patriae, praeluxit Lampadis instar,Deperdens oleam, non operam, Ille suam:In minimis fide Servo, majoribus apto,Maxima nunc Domini gaudia adire datur.

To Henry Robinson of Carlisle, Doctor of Sacred Theology, the most provident Provost of The Queen's College, Oxford, and also for 18 years the most vigilant Bishop of this church. On 19th June [13th of the Calends of July] in the year of the virgin birth 1616, in the 64th year of his age, he fell to sleep in the holy Lord. Bernard Robinson his brother and heir placed this memorial, a testimony of his love.

Not from him, but from the nation, the likeness of a light shines,Exhausting its oil, not his labour:In servitude to faith in the least things, as in greater things,He is now permitted to enter upon the greatest joy of the Lord.

References

1550s births
1616 deaths
Alumni of The Queen's College, Oxford
Fellows of The Queen's College, Oxford
Provosts of The Queen's College, Oxford
Principals of St Edmund Hall, Oxford
Bishops of Carlisle
16th-century Church of England bishops
17th-century Church of England bishops